Perrona obesa, common name the obese turrid, is a species of sea snail, a marine gastropod mollusk in the family Clavatulidae.

Description
The size of an adult shell varies between 35 mm and 55 mm. The whorls are corded below the suture, with a constriction below the cord. The color of the shell is yellowish white, flexuously lineated with chestnut, the corded portion white.

Distribution
This species occurs in the Atlantic Ocean off Angola.

References

 Reeve, Lovell Augustus. Conchologia systematica, or Complete System of Conchology: In which the Lepades and Conchiferous Mollusca are Described and Classified According to Their Natural Organization and Habits. Longman, Brown, Green and Longmans, 1842.
 Gofas, S.; Afonso, J.P.; Brandào, M. (Ed.). (S.a.). Conchas e Moluscos de Angola = Coquillages et Mollusques d'Angola. [Shells and molluscs of Angola]. Universidade Agostinho / Elf Aquitaine Angola: Angola. 140 pp.

External links
 

Endemic fauna of Angola
obesa
Gastropods described in 1842